Nowabad (also Romanized as Nowābād; also known as Nūrābād) is a village in Taqanak Rural District, in the Central District of Shahrekord County, Chaharmahal and Bakhtiari Province, Iran. At the 2006 census, its population was 699, in 191 families. The village is populated by Persians.

References 

Populated places in Shahr-e Kord County